Wuguishan Subdistrict is a subdistrict of the prefecture-level city of Zhongshan, Guangdong province, China. It has a population of 7,400 permanent residents and more than 20,000 migrants.

Name
It derives its name from "" in the district, which literally means "five osmanthus mountain" in English. The name of Xiangshan County, Zhongshan's old name, also derives from the mountain.

Geography
Situated in the southern part of Zhongshan, it borders with East District, South District, Sanxiang, Nanlang, Banfu of Zhongshan and Xiangzhou District of Zhuhai.

References

External links
Official website of Wuguishan District, Zhongshan

Zhongshan
Township-level divisions of Guangdong